Jane Castor (born December 7, 1960) is an American politician and former police chief serving as the 59th mayor of Tampa, Florida. 

She was the first woman and first openly gay person to serve as Chief of Police of the Tampa Police Department from 2009 to 2015 and the first openly gay person to be elected Mayor of Tampa.

Early life and education
Castor attended Chamberlain High School in Tampa and graduated in 1977. Castor attended the University of Tampa, where she played volleyball and basketball while earning a degree in criminology. Castor was inducted into the University of Tampa's Athletic Hall of Fame following her record-breaking performance on the women's basketball and volleyball teams. She graduated in 1981.  She got her Master of Public Administration from Troy State University by attending classes at MacDill Air Force Base. She also attended the FBI National Academy.

Police chief

Upon graduating from University of Tampa, Castor joined the Tampa Police Department, where she served 31 years in 1984, when she was 24. She became assistant chief in 2005. She was appointed as chief in 2009 and served until her retirement in 2015. Her tenure included a controversy over the targeting of African American cyclists for stops, searches, and tickets. A no-knock search warrant based on bad intel from a criminal informant resulted in the killing of Jason Westcott in 2014.

Mayor

In 2016 it was speculated that Castor would be a mayoral candidate in Tampa. Finally in April 2018, she officially announced her candidacy. In the 2019 Tampa mayoral election, held on March 5, 2019, Castor led all candidates, garnering 48.0% of the vote. In the runoff election held on April 23, she defeated David Straz with 73% of the vote compared to Straz's 27%. She is the city's first openly lesbian mayor. She is the eighth openly gay mayor in Florida. 
In 2019, Castor announced that her salary will be in Bitcoin. 

Castor was a member of the Republican Party until 2015 when she became a member of the Democratic Party.

References

External links 
  at City of Tampa, Florida
 

1960s births
21st-century American politicians
21st-century American women politicians
American women police officers
Chiefs of the Tampa Police Department
George D. Chamberlain High School alumni
Florida Democrats
Lesbian police officers
Lesbian politicians
LGBT mayors of places in the United States
LGBT people from Florida
Living people
Mayors of Tampa, Florida
University of Tampa alumni
Women mayors of places in Florida
Florida Republicans
American LGBT police officers